Talkha (  ) is a city in Dakahlia Governorate, Egypt. 
The city is located on the west bank of the Damietta, a distributary of the Nile in the Delta region. Is about 120 km northeast of Cairo. Talkha is situated opposite the city of Mansoura on the Damietta. Together, the two cities form an agglomeration.

Talkha contains the neighborhoods of Old Market, El Maalamein, Ar Rouda, El Sharifa, and El Muhandisin.

Climate 

Talkha is classified within the Köppen climate classification system as a hot desert (BWh).

See also

 List of cities and towns in Egypt

References

Populated places in Dakahlia Governorate
Cities in Egypt